Dian David Michael Jacobs (born 21 June 1977), commonly referred to as David Jacobs, is an Indonesian athlete who competes in table tennis, currently Class 10 para table tennis. Born in Ujung Pandang, he took up table tennis at the age of ten and rose quickly through national tournaments. He was training to play internationally by 2000, and in 2001 he won his first gold medal, at the SEATTA Games in Singapore. Since 2010 he has competed in para table tennis, having spent most of his career competing against athletes with full functionality. He competed in the 2012 Summer Paralympics in London, winning a bronze medal.

Early life
Jacobs was born in Ujung Pandang (now Makassar) on 21 June 1977. He is of Ambonese descent. He began playing table tennis at age ten, with the support of his parents Jan and Nell, as well as his brothers Rano, Piere, and Joe;  his three brothers also play table tennis. In 1989 his parents registered him with the PTP Club in Semarang; in his two years with the club he became a national champion at the elementary-school level.

When Jacobs was ready to begin his junior high school, the family moved to Jakarta. Jacobs was signed with UMS 80 Club. He continued to improve and joined the provincial team. In 1997 he was sent to Beijing to train at the Shi Cha Hai Sports School. By 2000 Jacobs was already being prepared to compete at the international level by the Indonesian Table Tennis Association. 
 Jacobs is married to Jeanny Palar, with whom he has one child.

Table tennis career
While earning a degree in management from the Perbanas School of Economics, Jacobs continued training. He participated in his first Southeast Asian Games (SEA Games) in 2001. Together with Yon Mardiono, in 2001 Jacobs won Indonesia's only gold medal at the SEATTA table tennis championship in Singapore. In the men's doubles competition they defeated the Thai duo Phucong Sanguansin and Phakphoom Sanguansin in three matches, scoring 11–4, 11–4, and 11–6. Paired with Mardiono for the first time for this tournament, Jacobs told The Jakarta Post that they "were determined not to let ourselves be dominated".

Jacobs continued to play at the SEA Games, competing in Vietnam (2003), the Philippines (2005), and Thailand (2007). He won the 2004 Pekan Olahraga Nasional competition for table tennis, which led to him receiving an honorary position at the Department of Sport; he became a full-time employee there in 2008. In 2008, Jacobs served as a coach for the Indonesian men's table tennis team, and in 2009 he competed at the SEA Games in Kuala Lumpur.

Para table tennis career
Jacobs began playing in para table tennis tournaments later that year, becoming a member of the National Paralympic Committee in 2010. He competes in Class 10, which is the highest level of functionality in the system. He usually trains with opponents who maintain full functionality. Jacobs himself has a problem with one of his hands.

At the 2010 Asian Para Games in Guangzhou, China, Jacobs won a bronze medal. Before the competition he had only a month to train. He competed in several international tournaments, winning a gold in Thailand, silver in Beijing, bronze in the Czech Republic, silver in the United Kingdom, and gold in Taiwan. At the 2011 ASEAN Para Games in Surakarta, Jacobs won seven gold medals: men's singles (open), men's doubles (open), mixed doubles (open), men's doubles, mixed doubles, team, and single. In January of the following year Jacobs took on Indonesian president Susilo Bambang Yudhoyono in a three-game series. Although the president won one game with a score of 13–11, Jacobs took the series, winning two games with the scores 11–7 and 11–9. After the competition, Yudhoyono gave a speech of the need to support Indonesia's disabled athletes.

In March 2012 Jacobs won two gold medals at the Protour Paratable Tennis Liknano Open in Italy. In the men's singles he defeated Ivan Karavec of the Czech Republic with a score of 11–9, 11–7, and 11–8, while in the men's team play he was paired with Komet Akbar and defeated teams from the Netherlands and Czech Republic. In June he won the Slovakian Table Tennis Tournament, ranking him among the top three in the world.

Jacobs is one of several athletes who represented Indonesia at the 2012 Summer Paralympics in London, with Ni Nengah Widiasih (powerlifting), the swimmer Agus Ngaimin, and an athletics competitor, Setyo Budi Hartanto. Jacobs won the bronze medal in the Table Tennis Men's Individual C10 classification. It was the nation's first Paralympic medal in over twenty years.

Awards and nominations

Achievements

Paralympic Games 

Men's singles

World Championships

Asian Para Games 

Men's singles

Men's doubles

Men's team

Asian Championships 

Men's singles

Southeast Asian Games 

Men's doubles

Men's team

ASEAN Para Games 

Men's singles

Men's doubles

Men's team

SEATTA Games 

Men's doubles

ITTF Para Table Tennis Tour 

Men's singles

Men's team

References
Footnotes

Bibliography

External links
 David Jacobs at International Para Table Tennis Federation

1977 births
Indonesian male table tennis players
Table tennis players at the 2012 Summer Paralympics
Paralympic table tennis players of Indonesia
Medalists at the 2012 Summer Paralympics
Paralympic medalists in table tennis
Paralympic bronze medalists for Indonesia
Sportspeople from Makassar
Living people
Table tennis players at the 2016 Summer Paralympics
Southeast Asian Games medalists in table tennis
Southeast Asian Games bronze medalists for Indonesia
Competitors at the 2001 Southeast Asian Games
Indonesian table tennis coaches
Table tennis players at the 2020 Summer Paralympics